"Cry Little Sister" is a song written by English singer-songwriter Gerard McMahon (under the pseudonym Gerard McMann) and Michael Mainieri, and performed by McMahon for the soundtrack to the 1987 film The Lost Boys, which peaked at number 15 on the Billboard 200. The original song failed to chart, although it charted in Australia and the United Kingdom in 2003 when the track was remixed.

The track has been covered by several other bands. Aiden recorded a cover for the soundtrack to the 2008 sequel, Lost Boys: The Tribe and appeared again in the closing credits of Lost Boys: The Thirst. In 2010, Seasons After scored a top twenty hit on Billboards Mainstream Rock Songs with their version of the track, after it was included on their 2010 album Through Tomorrow. Eight years later, Marilyn Manson released their version of the song as a single after it was featured in a promotional trailer for television series Titans.

Composition and style
The song was predominantly composed by McMahon, who said that its refrain was "brewing in my head with the choir as a chorus backing me. That all seemed to come within half an hour. [Producer] Mike Mainieri had this hypnotic beat, we refined it together and my melody and chords melted right into it. Then I wrote the lyrics within an hour or two [and] recorded the demo". Despite appearing on the soundtrack to The Lost Boys, the song's lyrics do not specifically reference vampires, as it was composed before McMahon had seen any footage from the film. After hearing the track, director Joel Schumacher commented: "You nailed my theme song to The Lost Boys! I can't believe you wrote this without seeing a frame of film!". McMahon additionally explained: "I always say that if I'd have seen the film first, I would probably not have written 'Cry Little Sister'. I didn't want the song to be specific to the vampire. I wanted it to be about the longing for family from a rejected youth's perspective, which I went through myself and that many of us have felt."

Remixes and re-releases
The track has been remixed on multiple occasions. It was remixed by The Lost Brothers and issued as a single in 2003 under the title "Cry Little Sister (I Need U Now)", crediting McMahon by the name of his current band, G Tom Mac. The remix peaked at number 21 on the UK Singles Chart, number fourteen in Scotland, and in the top forty of the Australian ARIA Charts. G Tom Mac subsequently released a number of other versions of the song. The "Rebel Angel Remix" was issued on their 2005 EP How to Be Pop, Stupid, Cool, while "Cry Little Sister... Thou Shalt Not (The Mash Up)" was included on the 2007 album Thou Shalt Not Fall. The latter version mashed the original recording with elements of the 2003 remix. A video for "Cry Little Sister (Club Cave Mix)" was produced by DJ Lee and G Tom Mac, and included as a bonus feature on the Lost Boys: The Tribe DVD in 2008. A blues-inspired acoustic rendition was released as a non-album single in 2009, subtitled the "Blood Swamp Version". In 2015, a remix of "Cry Little Sister" was featured on the trailer for the 'Definitive Edition' of the DmC: Devil May Cry video game.

Formats and track listings
 Original 7" single 
 "Cry Little Sister (Theme from The Lost Boys)" – 4:44
 "I Still Believe"  – 3:42

 2003 CD single 
 "Cry Little Sister (I Need U Now)"  – 2:44
 "U Don't Know Me"  – 8:10
 "Cry Little Sister (I Need U Now)"  – 8:19
 "Cry Little Sister (I Need U Now)" 

 2004 Maxi-single 
 "Cry Little Sister (I Need U Now)"  – 3:43
 "Cry Little Sister (I Need U Now)"  – 3:14
 "Cry Little Sister (I Need U Now)"  – 3:46
 "Cry Little Sister (I Need U Now)"  – 8:22
 "Cry Little Sister (I Need U Now)"  – 7:41
 "Cry Little Sister (I Need U Now)"  – 7:33

 2009 digital single
 "Cry Little Sister"  – 4:13

Charts

Marilyn Manson cover

Marilyn Manson released a cover version of the song on June 15, 2018. It was set to be the first single taken from the soundtrack to Josh Boone's then upcoming film, The New Mutants. The film was originally scheduled for an April 2018 release, but has since been delayed to August 28, 2020. According to Rolling Stone, the eponymous vocalist opted to release the song as originally planned, "rather than keeping [it] under wraps for another year". Despite the delay, Manson's version also appeared in another comic book adaption when it was played in the promo for the DC TV series Titans. The band had been performing the song live for several months during the "Heaven Upside Down Tour". A one-track digital single was issued on June 15. A music video for the song was released on June 28, and was directed by Bill Yukich, but when The New Mutants soundtrack album was finally released “Cry Little Sister” did not appear.

Charts

Other cover versions
 Charlie Sexton, on his 1989 self-titled album
 Mystic Circle, as a bonus track on their 2002 album Damien
 Zug Izland, on their 2003 album Cracked Tiles
 Blutengel, on their 2005 album The Oxidising Angel
 Nikki McKibbin, on her 2007 album, Unleashed
 Cover by Rock/Punk band Aiden for the 2007 film Lost Boys: The Tribe
 Vesperian Sorrow, on their 2007 album, Regenesis Creation (One of two bonus tracks)
 Joe Budden samples the track on his song "Thou Shall Not Fall" on his 2007 mixtape/album Mood Muzik 3.
 LA Guns, on their 2009 Album Covered in Guns
 I Will Never Be The Same, in 2009 on his debut album, Standby
 Eminem samples the track on his song "You're Never Over" on his 2010 album Recovery.
 Tangerine Dream, in their 2010 album Under Cover - Chapter One
 Celldweller released a "Klash-Up" in October 2012, featuring incidental music titled Hello Zepp from the first Saw movie.
 Krayzie Bone samples the track on his song "Hold on to Your Soul" on his 2015 album Chasing the Devil
 Dee Snider on the album Oculus Infernum, part of his side project Van Helsing's Curse.
 Tyga samples the track on "4 My Dawgs", a song on his 2015 album The Gold Album: 18th Dynasty.
 Lil B samples the track on "Unchain me", a song on his 2011 album I'm Gay (I'm Happy).
 Shining covers the song on their 2018 album X - Varg Utan Flock.
 Seasons After covers the song on their 2010 album Through Tomorrow.
 Ashbury Heights, on their official Youtube channel in 2019
 American metal band Ventana covered the song on their 2009 album American Survival Guide Vol. 1.
 American Metalvania Band Vomitron covered the song on their 2019 album, Vomitron 2, featuring Anneke van Giersbergen.
 Carfax Abbey, in 2004, on their album Second Skin.
 The Anix, in 2011, on their album Sleepwalker.
Charlotte Wessels, formerly of Delain, in 2021 on her Patreon Page monthly song release.
 Chvrches, in 2021, on the soundtrack for the Netflix film Nightbooks.
 Psyche, Video and digital single released on Halloween 2021.
 Silversun Pickups performed an acoustic cover for SiriusXM in 2019.
 Echodrone, a Shoegaze/Alt Rock band, covered the song on their 2012 release Mixtapes For Duckie.

References

 

Gothic rock songs
Songs written for films
1987 singles
1987 songs
Atlantic Records singles
2018 singles
Loma Vista Recordings singles
Marilyn Manson (band) songs
Songs written by Gerard McMahon